Valerie French is a 1923 adventure novel by the English author Dornford Yates (Cecil William Mercer), a sequel to Anthony Lyveden. It was first published in monthly instalments in The Windsor Magazine.

Plot 
Anthony Lyveden loses his memory, and confuses the two women who love him, Valerie French and André Strongi’th’arm.

Background 

After completing Anthony Lyveden, the chance reading of an article in The Spectator convinced Mercer that his writing needed more gravitas, and he significantly altered his style for this volume to incorporate the systematic use of the colon. He also introduced a device that became his trademark – the words 'More' or 'Worse' standing alone between periods. His biographer AJ Smithers commented, "Whether or not this was an improvement on his old style must be a matter of opinion."

Chapters

Illustrations 

The illustrations from the Windsor stories by Norah Schlegel (1879-1963) were not included in the book version.

Critical reception 
The editor of The Windsor Magazine reluctantly agreed to accept the book for publication. Smithers, writing in 1982, was not enthusiastic either, commenting that the seams show too clearly where the individual episodes have been padded out to the required length by moralising. He found both Lyveden and Miss French to be austere characters to whom it is impossible to warm, and felt that Mercer preferred the dog in his story to any of his human characters – and that he was probably right.

References

Bibliography
 

1923 British novels
Ward, Lock & Co. books
Novels by Dornford Yates